First-seeded Angela Mortimer defeated Lorraine Coghlan 6–3, 6–4 in the final to win the women's singles tennis title at the 1958 Australian Championships.

Seeds
The seeded players are listed below. Angela Mortimer is the champion; others show the round in which they were eliminated.

 Angela Mortimer (champion)
 Lorraine Coghlan (finalist)
 Mary Carter (semifinals)
 Mary Hawton (quarterfinals)
 Daphne Fancutt (first round)
 Maureen McCalman (second round)
 Thelma Long (second round)
 Fay Muller (quarterfinals)

Draw

Key
 Q = Qualifier
 WC = Wild card
 LL = Lucky loser
 r = Retired

Finals

Earlier rounds

Section 1

Section 2

External links
 

1958 in women's tennis
1958
1958 in Australian tennis
1958 in Australian women's sport